Ten Ton Studios is an online American comic book studio and messaging forum. It was founded in 2005 by 15 members as a venue where these creators could publish their material and creator-owned properties as well as have the ability to be freelance creators for others. Many founding members can be found working for the likes of Image Comics, IDW, Dark Horse Publishing, DC Comics, and Marvel Comics, as well as self-published successful creator owned projects through Comixology.

Projects
The Jam
The Ten Ton Sketch Book

External links
http://www.tentonstudios.com/
http://tentonstudios.deviantart.com/

Comic book publishing companies of the United States